Four Star Favorites is a compilation album of phonograph records released in 1941 by Artie Shaw and His Orchestra on Victor Records, containing studio recordings by his second, third and fourth orchestras.

During the 1930s and 40s, Shaw's orchestras recorded two main styles of music inside of the jazz genre, danceable pop music following conventions of the time (swing) and a more sophisticated blend of classical music and jazz, aided with a string section (orchestral jazz or early third stream). These styles opposed each other, and during his career Shaw's attempts to make art music oftentimes failed because it wasn't commercially viable.

Bridging the divide in Shaw's catalog, the compilation appealed to audiences of both swing music and more progressive forms of jazz. Well-reviewed upon release, the album stayed in-print for over a decade.

Background and reception
Acknowledged as the most cerebral of the dance bandleaders, throughout his career, Artie Shaw had an uneasy relationship with popularity. Preferring to record songs for perceived artistic value rather than cater to popular demand,  in 1938, his second band (after "Art Shaw and His New Music" in the middle 30s) struck massive success with "Begin the Beguine", a number-one hit for six weeks; From then on, the Shaw outfits were some of the most popular of the swing era. However, critics speculated Shaw never wanted the massive amount of success he received. Frustrated with the way his black musicians such as Billie Holiday were treated, the commercial nature of playing hit songs repetitively, and the music business in general, Shaw disbanded his orchestra in November 1939 and took 2 months off in a brief move to Acapulco, Mexico.

In Acapulco, Shaw first heard the then-new Alberto Domínguez composition "Frenesí". Reforming his band in early 1940 with the addition of a string section, Shaw recorded the song in March, which first appeared on Billboard charts on August 3. In late December, the single jumped from the 7th position to the top of the chart, holding its place for thirteen weeks and proving to be one of the largest hit singles of the 1940s decade. However, by the time the record hit number 1, Shaw had already progressed to his fourth band with largely different personnel. The sides included were representative of all three: tracks 2, 4, 6 and 8 were from Shaw's first successful orchestra and second overall; track 1 Shaw's third; and tracks 3, 5 and 7 his fourth.

Four Star Favorites was well received in music publications. The New Yorker designated it a "perfectly swell album... which includes several of the band's best accomplishments." Radio and Television Mirror briefly recommended it, and while Variety was positive, they noted the potential of fans to disagree with Victor's selections, due to the contrast between Shaw's more orchestral leanings and popular, danceable swing material. The American Music Lover, a publication mainly devoted to classical music, assigned the album four "A"s, their highest rating:
Don't look at the album and think it's re-hash of old stuff... Admit instead that it was a clever stunt on Victor's part to recouple eight sides of Artie's best contributions made during various stages of that mind-changing-about-musicians career of his... Artie, as a musician, shines in each piece... they're all well done.

Track listing
These reissued songs were featured on a 4-disc, 78 rpm album set, Victor P-85.

Disc 1: (27546)

Disc 2: (27547)

Disc 3: (27548)

Disc 4: (27549)

Release history
The original album was issued on four ten-inch 78 rpm records, September 5th, 1941 on Victor Records. Imprints of the album produced after February–March 1946 feature RCA Victor on the cover and labels. In 1949, truncated as six songs, the album was reissued on 45 rpm, WP 85. In 1950, after the format war between vinyl discs subsided, RCA Victor reached a cross-liscening agreement with Columbia to issue their records on LP. The following year, the label reissued the six-track album on a 10" LP, LPM-30.

Chart performance
While Four Star Favorites saw release nearly 3 years before the first Billboard magazine Best Selling Popular Albums chart appeared, the continued public interest in Shaw's recordings (and those of the swing era in general) kept the album in print for over 10 years. As such, it did chart, peaking at number 4 on July 28, 1945. The 1949 EP configuration also charted, debuting in late 1951 and reappearing at number 8 in early 1952.

Six out of the album's eight tracks charted upon their original release. "Beguine" and "Frenesí" were both number-one hits, as well as the only selections in the album to chart outside the United States. The four other songs all reached the Top 10 in the US.

Notes

Personnel
Track numbers reference the 78 rpm album configuration. Complete personnel per the Glenn Miller Archive, University of Colorado Boulder.

Woodwinds

 Artie Shaw – clarinet, leader
 Joe Krechter – bass clarinet 
 Bud Carlton  – alto saxophone 
 Blake Reynolds  – alto saxophone 
 Les Robinson – alto saxophone 
 Hank Freeman – alto saxophone, baritone saxophone 
 Neely Plumb – alto saxophone 
 Jack Stacy – tenor saxophone 
 Dick Clark – tenor saxophone 
 Ronnie Perry – tenor saxophone 
 Tony Pastor – tenor saxophone 
 Jerry Jerome – tenor saxophone 
 Bus Bassey – tenor saxophone 
 Phil Nemoli – oboe 
 Mort Ruderman – flute 

Brass

 Mannie Klein – trumpet 
 Charles Margolis – trumpet 
 George Thow – trumpet 
 Claude Bowen – trumpet 
 Chuck Peterson – trumpet 
 Johnny Best – trumpet 
 Jack Cathcart – trumpet 
 Billy Butterfield – trumpet 
 George Wendt – trumpet  
 Clyde Hurley – trumpet 
 Bernie Privin – trumpet 
 John Cave – flugelhorn 
 Bill Rank – trombone 
 Babe Bowman – trombone 
 Randall Miller – trombone 
 Ted Vesely – trombone 
 George Arus – trombone 
 Harry Rodgers – trombone 
 Vernon Brown – trombone 
 Jack Jenney – trombone 
 Ray Conniff – trombone 
 Les Jenkins  – trombone 

Strings

 Harry Bluestone – violin 
 Robert Barene – violin 
 Sid Brokaw – violin 
 Dave Cracov – violin 
 Peter Eisenberg – violin 
 Jerry Joyce – violin 
 Alex Law – violin 
 Mark Levant – violin 
 Alex Beller – violin 
 Truman Boardman – violin 
 Bill Brower – violin 
 Ted Klages – violin 
 Eugene Lamas – violin 
 Bob Morrow – violin 
 Jack Ray – viola 
 Stan Spiegelman – viola 
 Dave Sturkin – viola 
 Keith Collins – viola 
 Allan Harshman – viola 
 Irv Lipschultz – cello 
 Jules Tannenbaum – cello 
 Fred Goemer – cello 

Rhythm

 Stan Wrightsman – piano 
 Les Burness – piano 
 Johnny Guarnieri – piano 
 Bob Kitsis – piano 
 Bobby Sherwood – guitar 
 Al Avola – guitar 
 Al Hendrickson – guitar 
 Jud DeNaut – bass 
 Sid Weiss – bass 
 Carl Maus – drums 
 Cliff "Mr. Time" Leeman – drums 
 Nick Fatool – drums 
 Buddy Rich – drums 

Arrangers

 Artie Shaw
 William Grant Still 
 Jerry Gray 
 John Bartee 
 Lennie Hayton 
 Teddy McRae

References

1941 albums
RCA Victor compilation albums
Artie Shaw albums
Big band albums
Orchestral jazz albums